Margaret Randolph Higonnet (born Margaret Randolph Cardwell) is an American author, teacher and historian who currently serves as a Professor Emerita at University of Connecticut.

Early life and education

Higonnet was born in New Orleans, Louisiana, and came from an academic family – her mother a librarian and her father a professor. Later, the family moved from New Orleans to Maryland and then to Saint Louis, Missouri. Later, they would spend years in Pasadena, California, Vienna, Austria and Mexico City, Mexico. Margaret was the second of four girls and attended schools for girls and women. The family lived one year in Vienna, an occupied city where the impact of World War II was very visible. Higonnet attended Bryn Mawr College, graduating A.B. Magna cum laude in German in 1963. She also studied at the Eberhard Karls Universität Tübingen and University College London between 1963 and 1967. She obtained her PhD in Comparative Literature from Yale University with distinction in 1970. Higonnet began her teaching career as in Instructor at the department of English at George Washington University in 1967.

Career

Higonnet started teaching English and comparative literature at the University of Connecticut in 1970.
Higonnet has been President of the American Conference on Romanticism, the American Comparative Literature Association, and FILLM (Fédération internationale de langues et littératures modernes). She created the Gender Studies Committee of the ICLA, and was President of the ICLA committee on comparative literary history CHLEL. Higonnet has held fellowships from the Radcliffe Institute, the Rutgers Center for Historical Analysis, the Rockefeller Foundation, Instituto Juan March, the Fulbright Scholar Program and the DAAD.

She has worked on a range of topics including comparative literature, the literature of World War I, feminist theory, suicide, and children's literature. Her recent edited volume, "Nurses at the Front and Letters and Photographs from the Battle Country: The World War I Memoir of Margaret Hall" recover women's writings about World War I, as did her anthology, "Lines of Fire: Women Writers of World War I." She edited two collections of papers in comparative journals drawn from meetings of CHLEL: “New Europe, New Literary Histories,” (YCGL) and “Gender in Literary History” (CCS).

Awards and honors
 Best critical article of 1987 ("Narrative Fractures and Fragments"). Children's Literature Association, Literary Criticism Award
 Best critical article of 1992 ("Civility Books"). Children's Literature Association, Literary Criticism Award.
 "Behind the Lines, Across Boundaries: A Conference in Honor of Margaret R. Higonnet,” University of Connecticut, September 22–23, 2016

Personal life
Higonnet married Harvard University professor Patrice Higonnet in 1976; they have one daughter Ethel, born in 1979.

Bibliography

Books (author)

Books (editor)

 with Carolyn Heilbrun, The Representation of Women in Fiction.  |location=Baltimore
 |publisher=Johns Hopkins U. P |year=1981 }}
 with Barbara Rosen, Children's Literature..  |location=New Haven |publisher=Yale U. P.|year=1985 }}
 with Sonia Michel, Behind the Lines: Gender and the Two World Wars..  |location=New Haven|publisher=Yale U. P. |year=1987 }}
 
 with Maria de Valdes, New Visions of Creation |location= Tokyo |publisher= U. Tokyo P. |year=1993}}
 
 with Joan Templeton, Reconfigured Spheres: Literary Representations of Feminine Space  |location=Amherst, Massachusetts |publisher= U. Massachusetts P. |year=1994 }}
 
 
 with Beverly Clark, Girls, Boys, Books, Toys.  |location=Washington, DC|publisher=Johns Hopkins U.P. |year=1999 }}
 Guy Adams Cardwell, Stories and Poetry. New Britain: Hitchcock, 2005.
 with Jarrod Hayes and William Spurlin, Comparatively Queer: Interrogating Identity across Time and Cultures  |location=New York|publisher=Palgrave. |year=2010 }}
 with Susan Solomon, Margaret Hall's Letters and Photographs from the Battle Country.  |location=Boston|publisher=Massachusetts Historical Society |year=2014 }}

References

External links
 https://english.uconn.edu/margaret-higonnet/

  UCONN Faculty webpage

People from New Orleans
1941 births
University of Connecticut faculty
21st-century American historians
Bryn Mawr College alumni
Yale University alumni
George Washington University faculty
Living people
Historians from Louisiana